Cyberknife may refer to:

 Cyberknife (horse), a Thoroughbred race horse, winner of the 2022 Arkansas Derby
 Cyberknife (device), is a radiation therapy device manufactured by Accuray Incorporated 
 Oklahoma CyberKnife, is a cancer treatment center based in Oklahoma 
 Reno CyberKnife, is a cancer treatment center based in Reno, Nevada